People with the name Maspero include:

François Maspero (1932–2015), French author and journalist
Gaston Maspero (1846–1916), French Egyptologist
Georges Maspero (1872–1942), French sinologist, son of Gaston
Henri Maspero (1882–1945), French sinologist, son of Gaston
Jean Maspero (1885–1915), French papyrologist, son of Gaston
Riccardo Maspero (born 1970), Italian footballer

Other uses
Maspero television building, Cairo, Egypt
 Maspero demonstrations, demonstrations by Egyptian Copts in 2011
 Éditions Maspero, Paris publishing house founded by François Maspero